Sergey Shorgin (born 1952) is a Russian mathematician, Dr.Sc., Professor, a scientist in the field of informatics, a poet, a translator of poetry.

Biography
He graduated from the faculty MSU CMC (1974). He defended his thesis for the degree of candidate of physical and mathematical sciences (1979). He defended his thesis «Defining Insurance Tariffs: Stochastic Models and Methods of Evaluation» for the degree of Doctor of Physical and Mathematical Sciences (1979). Was awarded the title of professor (2003). Published more than 100 scientific papers, including articles in leading scientific journals.

Deputy Director of Institute of Informatics Problems RAS.

Since 1999 she has been translating foreign poetry into Russian and writing her own poems. Among his translated poems are works of classics and contemporary authors of English, Scottish, American (USA), Australian, Canadian, Polish, Ukrainian, Belarusian, Slovak, German literature.

References

External links 
 Institute of Informatics Problems RAS
 Scientific works of Sergey Shorgin
 Scientific works of Sergey Shorgin
 Sergey Shorgin on the website «The Age of Translation»

1952 births
Living people
Moscow State University alumni
Russian computer scientists
Russian mathematicians